Sergei Petrovich Gorchakov (10 February 1905 – 4 July 1976) was a Russian classical music composer.  Gorchakov is best known for his uniquely 'Russian' orchestration of Pictures at an Exhibition by Modest Mussorgsky.

References

External links
 

1905 births
1976 deaths
Russian composers
Russian male composers
20th-century composers
20th-century Russian male musicians